John Dare (19 August 1906 – 10 February 1996) was a Guyanese cricketer. He played in eleven first-class matches for British Guiana from 1924 to 1939.

See also
 List of Guyanese representative cricketers

References

External links
 

1906 births
1996 deaths
Guyanese cricketers
Guyana cricketers
Sportspeople from Georgetown, Guyana